Elaeis oleifera is a species of palm commonly called the American oil palm. It is native to South and Central America from Honduras to northern Brazil.

Unlike its relative Elaeis guineensis, the African oil palm, it is rarely planted commercially to produce palm oil, but hybrids between the two species are, mainly in efforts to provide disease resistance and to increase the proportion of unsaturated fatty acids in the oil.

References

Cocoseae
Oil palm
Flora of Honduras
Flora of Costa Rica
Flora of Nicaragua
Flora of Panama
Flora of French Guiana
Flora of Suriname
Flora of Colombia
Flora of Peru
Flora of Brazil
Plants described in 1897